Michael Rosas is an American singer, songwriter and guitarist, best known for his involvement in the band Smile (1992–2003) and as a solo artist, performing and releasing music under his own name.

References

Living people
American male guitarists
American male singer-songwriters
American singer-songwriters
Year of birth missing (living people)